The Shapley value is a solution concept in cooperative game theory. It was named in honor of Lloyd Shapley, who introduced it in 1951 and won the Nobel Memorial Prize in Economic Sciences for it in 2012. To each cooperative game it assigns a unique distribution (among the players) of a total surplus generated by the coalition of all players. The Shapley value is characterized by a collection of desirable properties. Hart (1989) provides a survey of the subject.

The setup is as follows: a coalition of players cooperates, and obtains a certain overall gain from that cooperation. Since some players may contribute more to the coalition than others or may possess different bargaining power (for example threatening to destroy the whole surplus), what final distribution of generated surplus among the players should arise in any particular game? Or phrased differently: how important is each player to the overall cooperation, and what payoff can he or she reasonably expect? The Shapley value provides one possible answer to this question.

For cost-sharing games with concave cost functions, the optimal cost-sharing rule that optimizes the price of anarchy, followed by the price of stability, is precisely the Shapley value cost-sharing rule. (A symmetrical statement is similarly valid for utility-sharing games with convex utility functions.) In mechanism design, this means that the Shapley value solution concept is optimal for these sets of games.

Formal definition 

Formally, a coalitional game is defined as:
The function  is called a characteristic function.

The function  has the following meaning: if S is a coalition of players, then (S), called the worth of coalition S, describes the total expected sum of payoffs the members of  can obtain by cooperation.

The Shapley value is one way to distribute the total gains to the players, assuming that they all collaborate. It is a "fair" distribution in the sense that it is the only distribution with certain desirable properties listed below. According to the Shapley value, the amount that player i is given in a coalitional game  is

where n is the total number of players and the sum extends over all subsets S of N not containing player i. Also note that  is the multinomial coefficient. The formula can be interpreted as follows: imagine the coalition being formed one actor at a time, with each actor demanding their contribution (S∪{i}) − (S) as a fair compensation, and then for each actor take the average of this contribution over the possible different permutations in which the coalition can be formed.

An alternative equivalent formula for the Shapley value is:

Finally, it can also be expressed as

 

which can be interpreted as

In terms of synergy 

From the characteristic function  one can compute the synergy that each group of players provides. The synergy is the unique function , such that

 

for any subset  of players.

Given a characteristic function , the synergy function  is calculated via

 

using the Inclusion exclusion principle. In other words, the synergy of coalition  is the value  , which is not already accounted for by its subsets.

The Shapley values are given in terms of the synergy function by

 

where the sum is over all subsets  of  that include player .

This can be interpreted as 

 

In other words, the synergy of each coalition is divided equally between all members.

Examples

Business example 
Consider a simplified description of a business. An owner, o, provides crucial capital in the sense that, without him/her, no gains can be obtained. There are m workers w1,...,wm, each of whom contributes an amount p to the total profit. Let

The value function for this coalitional game is

This can be understood from the perspective of synergy. The synergy function  is

so the only coalitions that generate synergy are one-to-one between the owner and any individual worker.

Using the above formula for the Shapley value in terms of  we compute

 
and

Glove game 
The glove game is a coalitional game where the players have left- and right-hand gloves and the goal is to form pairs. Let

where players 1 and 2 have right-hand gloves and player 3 has a left-hand glove.

The value function for this coalitional game is

The formula for calculating the Shapley value is

The following table displays the marginal contributions of Player 1.

Observe

By a symmetry argument it can be shown that

Due to the efficiency axiom, the sum of all the Shapley values is equal to 1, which means that

Properties 

The Shapley value has many desirable properties.

Efficiency 
The sum of the Shapley values of all agents equals the value of the grand coalition, so that all the gain is distributed among the agents:

Proof: 

since  is a telescoping sum and there are |N|! different orderings R.

Symmetry 

This property is also called equal treatment of equals.

Linearity 

for every  in . Also, for any real number ,

for every  in .

Null player 
The Shapley value  of a null player  in a game  is zero. A player  is null in  if  for all coalitions  that do not contain .

Given a player set , the Shapley value is the only map from the set of all games to payoff vectors that satisfies all four properties: Efficiency, Symmetry, Linearity, Null player.

Stand-alone test 
If  is a subadditive set function, i.e., then for each agent : .

Similarly, if  is a superadditive set function, i.e., then for each agent :  .

So, if the cooperation has positive externalities, all agents (weakly) gain, and if it has negative externalities, all agents (weakly) lose.

Anonymity 
This means that the labeling of the agents doesn't play a role in the assignment of their gains.

Marginalism 
The Shapley value can be defined as a function which uses only the marginal contributions of player  as the arguments.

Characterization 
The Shapley value not only has desirable properties, it is also the only payment rule satisfying some subset of these properties. For example, it is the only payment rule satisfying the four properties of Efficiency, Symmetry, Linearity and Null player. See for more characterizations.

Aumann–Shapley value 
In their 1974 book, Lloyd Shapley and Robert Aumann extended the concept of the Shapley value to infinite games (defined with respect to a non-atomic measure), creating the diagonal formula. This was later extended by Jean-François Mertens and Abraham Neyman.

As seen above, the value of an n-person game associates to each player the expectation of his contribution to the worth or the coalition or players before him in a random ordering of all the players. When there are many players and each individual plays only a minor role, the set of all players preceding a given one is heuristically thought as a good sample of the players so that the value of a given infinitesimal player  around as "his" contribution to the worth of a "perfect" sample of the population of all players.

Symbolically, if  is the coalitional worth function associating to each coalition  measured subset of a measurable set  that can be thought as  without loss of generality.

 

This is the heuristic form of the diagonal formula.

Under such conditions

 ,

as can be shown by approximating the density by a step function and keeping the proportion  for each level of the density function, and

 

The diagonal formula has then the form developed by Aumann and Shapley (1974)

 

In the argument above if the measure contains atoms  is no longer true—this is why the diagonal formula mostly applies to non-atomic games.

Two approaches were deployed to extend this diagonal formula when the function  is no longer differentiable. Mertens goes back to the original formula and takes the derivative after the integral thereby benefiting from the smoothing effect. Neyman took a different approach. Going back to an elementary application of Mertens's approach from Mertens (1980):

 

This works for example for majority games—while the original diagonal formula cannot be used directly. How Mertens further extends this by identifying symmetries that the Shapley value should be invariant upon, and averaging over such symmetries to create further smoothing effect commuting averages with the derivative operation as above. A survey for non atomic value is found in Neyman (2002)

Generalization to coalitions 
The Shapley value only assigns values to the individual agents.  It has been generalized to apply to a group of agents C as,

 

 

where the sum goes over all subsets  of  that contain .

This formula suggests the interpretation that the Shapley value of a coalition is to be thought of as the standard Shapley value of a single player, if the coalition  is treated like a single player.

Value of a player to another player 
The Shapley value  was decomposed in into a matrix of values

 

Each value  represents the value of player  to player . This matrix satisfies 

 

i.e. the value of player  to the whole game is the sum of their value to all individual players.

In terms of the synergy  defined above, this reads

 

 take the synergy  of that subset
 divide it by the number of players in the subset . Interpret that as the surplus value player  gains from this coalition

In machine learning 
The Shapley value provides a principled way to explain the predictions of nonlinear models common in the field of machine learning. By interpreting a model trained on a set of features as a value function on a coalition of players,  Shapley values provide a natural way to compute which features contribute to a prediction. This unifies several other methods including Locally Interpretable Model-Agnostic Explanations (LIME), DeepLIFT, and Layer-Wise Relevance Propagation.

See also 
 Airport problem
 Banzhaf power index
 Shapley–Shubik power index

References

Further reading

External links 
 
 Shapley Value Calculator
 Calculating a Taxi Fare using the Shapley Value

Game theory
Cooperative games
Fair division
Lloyd Shapley